4-Chloromercuribenzoic acid (p-chloromercuribenzoic acid, PCMB) is an organomercury compound that is used as a protease inhibitor, especially in molecular biology applications.

PCMB reacts with thiol groups in proteins and is therefore an inhibitor of enzymes that are dependent on thiol reactivity, including cysteine proteases such as papain and acetylcholinesterase.  Because of this reactivity with thiols, PCMB is also used in titrimetric quantification of thiol groups in proteins.

See also
 4-Aminophenylmercuric acetate

References

Benzoic acids
Organomercury compounds
Protease inhibitors